This pages is a list of venues in Neath Port Talbot county borough.

Cultural venues

Performing arts
Afan Lido, Port Talbot
Glan-yr-Afon Arts Centre, Neath Campus, Neath Port Talbot College Neath 
Gwyn Hall, Neath
Princess Royal Theatre, Port Talbot
Pontardawe Arts Centre, Pontardawe
Neath Little Theatre

Sporting Venues

Stadia
The Gnoll, Neath
Talbot Athletic Ground, Aberavon RFC, Port Talbot
Victoria Road, Port Talbot Town FC
Runtech Stadium, Afan Lido FC
Aberavon Quins RFC, Harlequin Road, Port Talbot
Aberavon Fighting Irish RLFC, Little Warren, Port Talbot
Walters Arena, Glynneath

Mountain biking
Afan Forest Park

Golf courses
Glynneath Golf Club, Glynneath
Lakeside Golf Club, Margam
Maesteg Golf Course, Maesteg
Neath Golf Club, Neath
Pontardawe Golf Club, Pontardawe
Swansea Bay Golf Club, Crymlyn Burrows

See also
List of places in Neath Port Talbot - for a list of settlements
List of places in Neath Port Talbot (categorised)

List of venues in Neath Port Talbot
Neath Port Talbot
Tourist attractions in Neath Port Talbot